The Very Best of Redbone is one of several compilation albums by American band Redbone which includes their 1973 European hit "We Were All Wounded At Wounded Knee".

Track listing
"The Witch Queen of New Orleans" ¤
"Come and Get Your Love" +
"Wovoka" +
"Niki Hokey" ¤
"The Sun Never Shines on the Lonely" ¤
"Niji Trance" ¤
"Fais-Do" %
"Maggie" ¤
"Poison Ivy" %
"Only You and Rock and Roll" +
"We Were All Wounded at Wounded Knee" %
"Chant: 13th Hour" ¤
"When You Got Trouble" ¤
"Light as a Feather" ¤
"Suzi Girl" +
"Power (Prelude to a Means)" ¤
"Tennessee Girl" ¤
"Message from a Drum" ¤
"One More Time" +
"Alcatraz" ¤

Personnel
 Lolly Vegas – guitars, vocals
 Pat Vegas – bass, vocals
 Tony Bellamy – guitars, vocals
 Peter DePoe - drums, percussion¤
 Arturo Perez - drums, percussion%
 Butch Rillera - drums, percussion+

References
 

1991 compilation albums
Redbone (band) albums
Epic Records compilation albums